Colin W. Sargent, Ph.D., is an American author, magazine publisher, and playwright. He is the founding Editor and Publisher of Portland Magazine, “Maine’s City Magazine.” He also teaches writing at William and Mary.

Biography 
Colin W. Sargent was born in Portland, Maine, on November 5, 1954. He attended the United States Naval Academy, graduating in 1977. Following his graduation, he attended the University of Southern Maine, earning his MFA in Creative Writing from the Stonecoast MFA Writing Program in 2004. Sargent earned his Ph.D. in Creative Writing at Lancaster University, Lancaster, UK in 2013, after defending his dissertation, the novel Hiding Nothing, with a companion exegesis "The Negative Mirror."  His research is in cognitive literary studies that explore reading as an out-of-body experience. In addition to working as the Editor for Portland Magazine , Sargent currently teaches at William and Mary as an adjunct lecturer specializing in creative and nonfiction writing.

Writings

Editorial 
From 1981–1983, following his graduation from the United States Naval Academy, Sargent was the Managing Editor for the Navy's Approach Magazine. In 1985, Sargent became the founding editor and publisher of Portland Magazine, also known as "Maine's City Magazine," or Portland Monthly, in Portland, Maine.

Novels 
His debut novel Museum of Human Beings (2009) delves into the life of Jean-Baptiste Charbonneau, the son of Sacagawea.

His novel The Boston Castrato was published in 2016 by Barbican Press of London and Hull , UK, and was nominated for the Booker Prize. According to London's Morning Star: "An extraordinary literary expression of the American nightmare." 

His newest book, Red Hands, is an account of the Romanian revolution in the voice of Nicolae Ceaușescu’s daughter-in-law. The novel is derived from eight hundred hours of unique interviews with Iordana Ceaușescu. Published in Great Britain in 2020, the U.S. launch was in February 2023.

Poetry 
His first book of poetry was Luftwaffe Snowshoes (Portsmouth Arts Center), followed by Blush and Undertow, both published by Coyote Love Press. Undertow earned Pick of the Month notice in Small Press Review.

Screenplay 
His 2001 play "100 Percent American Girl," is about the imagined return of World War II radio propagandist Axis Sally (a.k.a. Mildred Sisk and Mildred Gillars) to a modern congregate care facility in her old hometown—where some retired GIs' ears prick up at the sound of her voice. It was a winner at the Maine Playwrights Festival and was produced at the Maine Festival and Arts Conservatory Theater and Studio (ACTS) in 2002.

Awards 
In 2003, Colin Sargent was the winner of a Maine Individual Artist Fellowship in Literature presented by the Maine Arts Commission.

Bibliography

Novels 

 Museum of Human Beings. McBooks Press. 2008. ISBN 9781590131671
 The Boston Castrato. Barbican Press. 2016. ISBN 9781909954205
 Red Hands. Barbican Press. UK release in 2020. US release in 2023. ISBN 978-1909954397

Poetry 

 Luftwaffe Snowshoes. Portsmouth Community Arts Center. 1984.
 Blush. Coyote Love Press. 1984. ISBN 9780913341117
 Undertow. Coyote Love Press. 1985. ASIN ‎B0006PAR6Q

Plays 

 100 Percent American Girl. 2001.

References

Further reading
 Sargent, Colin (2008). Museum of Human Beings. Ithaca: McBooks.
 Sargent, Colin (1995). Undertow. Brunswick: Coyote Love.
 Sargent, Colin (1987). Blush. Brunswick: Coyote Love.
 Portland Magazine, Sargent, Colin, ed. Portland: Sargent Publishing, Inc.
 Approach Magazine, United States Navy. Norfolk: Naval Safety Center.
 Publishers Weekly, Sara Nelson, ed. September 1, 2008. New York: Reed Business.

External links

 http://archive.boston.com/ae/books/articles/2008/11/30/shelf_life/
 https://washingtoncitypaper.com/article/327013/the-boston-castrato-reviewed/

 Author Colin Sargent

1954 births
Living people
United States Naval Academy alumni
American magazine founders
Writers from Portland, Maine